Xanthorrhoea drummondii, commonly known as blackboy, grasstree or Drummond's balga, is a species of grasstree of the genus Xanthorrhoea native to Western Australia.

Description
It blooms between September and November producing yellow-white flowers.

The stem is usually simple with a single crown. Young leaves in form a stiffly erect tuft with older leaves often strongly reflexed forming a skirt around the stem.

Taxonomy
The species was first formally described by the botanist William Henry Harvey in 1855 as part of Hooker's Journal of Botany and Kew Garden Miscellany.

Distribution
The species is found in the Perth hills and in coastal areas of the Mid West, Wheatbelt and Great Southern regions of Western Australia where it grows in sandy soils over laterite.

Cultivation
X. drummondii is cultivated in gardens and is easily grown from seed. It prefers a light well-drained soil in full sun. It is both drought tolerant and frost resistant.

References

Asparagales of Australia
drummondii
Angiosperms of Western Australia
Plants described in 1855
Endemic flora of Southwest Australia